The Canelo Hills are a range of low mountains or hills in eastern Santa Cruz County, Arizona. The range consists of a series of northwest–southeast trending ridges extending from the Sonoita Creek valley southwest of Sonoita to the Parker Canyon Lake area in southwest Cochise County, Arizona. The Canelo Hills merge with the Huachuca Mountains to the southeast. The San Rafael Valley lies to the southwest of the range and the Patagonia Mountains lie to the west across the Harshaw Creek valley. The Canelo Hills Cienega Reserve and the ghost town of Canelo, Arizona, are located on the eastern side of the hills.

Geology

The Canelo Hills are underlain by northwest striking folded and faulted Permian sedimentary rocks and Jurassic–Triassic volcanic rocks. The southwest margin extending toward the Patagonias is underlain by Cretaceous–Eocene volcanics. The southern end of the Canelo Hills contain evidence for a volcanic caldera, the Parker Canyon Caldera. The Jurassic volcanics in the area consist of rhyolite welded tuff containing large exotic blocks of limestone, quartzite and other rock types interpreted as "intercaldera megabreccia lenses".

See also

 Ciénega Creek

Picture gallery

References

 
 

Hills of Arizona
Mountain ranges of Santa Cruz County, Arizona
Mountain ranges of Arizona
Geology of Arizona